This is a list of disused railway stations within the county of  West Midlands, a metropolitan county in central England which includes the cities of Birmingham, Coventry and Wolverhampton.  It includes all railway stations in the West Midlands that no longer currently have regular timetabled train services.

Railway stations

See also

 List of West Midlands railway stations
 List of closed railway stations in Britain
 List of closed railway stations in London
 Closed London Underground stations
 List of London Underground stations
 List of Docklands Light Railway stations
 List of London railway stations
 List of Parkway railway stations in Britain
 List of railway stations in Merseyside
 List of railway stations in Wales

External links
 Warwickshire Railways

References

 
West Midlands, closed
Lists of buildings and structures in the West Midlands (county)